Garowe District is a district in the northeastern Nugal region of Somalia. Its capital is Garoowe.

References

External links
 Districts of Somalia
 Administrative map of Garowe District

Districts of Somalia

Nugal, Somalia